Lytle is an unincorporated community in Walker County, in the U.S. state of Georgia.

History
A post office called Lytle was in operation from 1890 until 1910. The community's name may honor William Haines Lytle, a Union officer killed in Georgia in the American Civil War.

The Georgia General Assembly incorporated Lytle as a town in 1917; the town's municipal charter was repealed in 1995.

References

Former municipalities in Georgia (U.S. state)
Unincorporated communities in Walker County, Georgia
Unincorporated communities in Georgia (U.S. state)
Populated places disestablished in 1995